Lutz is a surname and given name, occasionally a short form of Ludwig and Ludger. People with the name include:

Surname
Adolfo Lutz (1855–1940), Brazilian physician
Aleda E. Lutz (1915–1944), American Army flight nurse
Alois Lutz, Austrian figure skater, for whom the Lutz jump is named
Anke Lutz (born 1970), German chess master
Berta Lutz (1894–1976), Brazilian scientist and feminist
Bob Lutz (American football), American high school football coach
Bob Lutz (businessman) (born 1932), Swiss American V.P. of General Motors
Bob Lutz (tennis) (born 1947), American tennis player
Bobby Lutz (basketball) (born 1958), American college basketball coach
Brenda Lutz, Scottish-American political science writer
Carl Lutz (1895–1975), Swiss vice-consul to Hungary during WWII, credited with saving over 62,000 Jews
Chris Lutz, (born 1985), American-Filipino professional basketball player
Christopher Lutz (born 1971), German chess grandmaster
Eduard von Lutz, (1810–1893), Bavarian Major General and War Minister
Edwin George Lutz, American illustrator and author
Élisabeth Lutz (1914–2008), French mathematician
Elvira Lutz (born 1935), Uruguayan midwife, educator, and writer
Erwin Lutz, Austrian prison chef, who protected Jews in WWII
Friedel Lutz (born 1939), German football player
Friedrich Lutz (1852–1918), Bavarian politician
Friedrich A. Lutz (1901–1975), German economist
Gabrielle Lutz (1935–2011), French Olympic sprint canoeist
Gary Lutz, American writer of poetry and fiction
George Lutz and Kathy Lutz, basis for the family depicted in The Amityville Horror
Giles A. Lutz (1910–1982), American author of Western novels
Gizella Lutz (1906–1992), Hungarian wife of Ferenc Szálasi
Hans Lutz (born 1949), German track and road cyclist
Hartmut Lutz (born 1945), German professor of Canadian and American Studies
Hermann Lutz (1881–1965), German civil servant and social science writer
Jack Lutz, American computer scientist
Jarka Lutz, Czechoslovak-French slalom canoeist
Jean Baptiste Lutz (born 1988), French sprint canoeist
Jo Lutz (born 1980), Australian rower
John Lutz (born 1973), American television writer and actor
J. D. Lutz, a fictionalized version of this person on 30 Rock
John Lutz (mystery writer) (1939–2021), American author of mystery novels
Joe Lutz (1925–2008), American professional baseball player and coach
Joseph Lutz (general) (1933–1999), American major general
Joseph Lutz (politician) (born 1948), American politician
Julie Lutz, American astronomer
Karen McCullah Lutz, American screenwriter and novelist
Kellan Lutz (born 1985), American actor
Ken Lutz (born 1965), American football player
Larry Lutz (1913–1998), American football player and coach
Mark Lutz (actor) (born 1970), American actor
Mark Lutz (athlete) (born 1951), American sprinter
Mark A. Lutz (born 1941), Swiss-born economics professor
Martin Lutz (born 1950), German conductor
Matilda Lutz (born 1991), Italian actress
Matt Lutz (born 1978), American actor
Meyer Lutz (1829–1903), German composer of musicals
Oswald Lutz (1876–1944), first German tank general
Philip Lutz, Jr. (1888–1947), American politician
Raymond Lutz (born 1957), American businessman, electronics engineer and politician
Rudolf Lutz (born 1951), Swiss harpsichordist and conductor
Russell Lutz (born 1968), American science fiction author
Ton Lutz, (1919–2009), Dutch actor
Vera Lutz (1912–1976), British economist
Wil Lutz (born 1994), American football placekicker
William D. Lutz (born 1940), American linguist
Winifred Ann Lutz (born 1942), American sculptor and fiber artist
Zach Lutz (born 1986), American professional baseball player

First name or nickname
Lutz Altepost (born 1981), German flatwater canoeist
Lutz Bacher (1943–2019), pseudonym of an American artist in a variety of media
Lutz Dombrowski (born 1959), German long jumper
Lutz Eigendorf (1956–1983), German footballer and defector
Lutz Fleischer (born 1956), German painter and graphic artist
Lutz Gerresheim (1958–1980), German footballer
Lutz Glandien (born 1954), German classical and electroacoustic composer and musician
Lutz Goepel (born 1942), German politician
Lutz Hachmeister (born 1959), German media historian, filmmaker and journalist
Lutz Heck, Ludwig George Heinrich Heck, (1892–1983), German zoologist
Lutz Heilmann (born 1966), German left-wing politician
Lutz Heßlich (born 1959), German racing cyclist
Lutz Hoffmann (1959–1997), German Olympic gymnast
Lutz Jacobi (born 1955), Dutch politician
Lutz Jäncke (born 1957), neuropsychologist
Lutz Kayser, German aerospace engineer, founded OTRAG
Lutz Kleveman (born 1974), German author, journalist and photographer
Lutz Körner, German slalom canoeist
Lutz Kühnlenz, German luger
Lutz Langer, German Paralympic shot putter
Lutz Lindemann (born 1949), German football coach and former player
Lutz Liwowski (born 1967), German sprint canoeist
Lutz Long (1913–1943), German Olympic long jumper
Lutz Mack (born 1952), German Olympic gymnast
Lutz Meyer-Goßner (born 1936), German jurist and law professor
Lutz Mommartz (born 1934), German filmmaker
Lutz Pfannenstiel (born 1973), German football goalkeeper
Lutz Philipp (1940–2012), German Olympic long-distance runner
Lutz Rathenow (born 1952), German dissident writer and poet
Lutz Roeder, software engineer, author of .NET Reflector
Lutz D. Schmadel (1942–2016), German astronomer
Lutz Schülbe (born 1961), German footballer
Lutz Graf Schwerin von Krosigk (1887–1977), German politician
Lutz Taufer, German activist with links to the Socialist Patients' Collective (SPK)
Lutz Templin, (1901–1973), German jazz bandleader
Lutz Ulbricht (born 1942), German Olympic rower 
Lutz Unger (born 1951), German Olympic swimmer
Lutz Wahl (1869–1928), American major general
Lutz Wanja (born 1956), German Olympic backstroke swimmer
Lutz Wienhold (born 1965), German footballer
Lutz Winde (born 1966), German actor and director
Lutz Wingert (born 1958), German philosopher

German masculine given names
German-language surnames
Informal personal names
Hypocorisms
Surnames from given names